J. Derham Cole (born March 12, 1977) is an American politician. He was a member of the South Carolina House of Representatives from the 32nd District, serving from 2009 to 2018. He is a member of the Republican party.

References

Living people
1977 births
Republican Party members of the South Carolina House of Representatives
Politicians from Columbia, South Carolina
21st-century American politicians